The following is a list of chairmen of Associazione Sportiva Roma.

Presidential history
Roma have had numerous chairmen over the course of their history, some of which have been the owners of the club, others have been honorary chairmen. Here is a complete list of Roma chairmen from 1927 until the present day.

List based on years of chairmanship
Below is a list of chairmen based in order of terms.

15 years
Franco Sensi (1993-08)
13 years
Renato Sacerdoti (1928–35 and 1952–58)
12 years
Dino Viola (1979–91)
8 years
Gaetano Anzalone (1971–79)
James Pallotta (2012-2020)
5 years
Hyginus Betti (1936–41)
Peter Baldassarre (1944–49)
4 years
Anacleto Gianni (1958–62)
3 years
Pier Carlo Restagno (1949–52)
Francesco Marini Dettina (1962–65)
Franco Evangelisti (1965–68)
Rosella Sensi (2008–11)
2 years
Edgardo Bazzini (1941–43)
Alvaro Marchini (1969–71)
Giuseppe Ciarrapico (1991–93)
1 year
Italo Foschi (1927–28)
Scialoja Antonio (1935–36)
Francesco Ranucci (1968–69)
Thomas DiBenedetto (2011–12)
Dan Friedkin (2020-present)
less than one year
Romulus Vasey (1952)
Flora Viola (1991)
Ciro Di Martino (1993)
Roberto Cappelli (2011)

References

A.S. Roma